Prickly pears (genus Opuntia) include a number of plant species that were introduced and have become invasive in Australia.

Prickly pears (mostly Opuntia stricta) were imported into Australia in the First Fleet as hosts of cochineal insects, used in the dye industry. Many of these, especially the tiger pear, quickly became widespread invasive species, rendering  of farming land unproductive. The moth Cactoblastis cactorum from Argentina, whose larvae eat prickly pear, was introduced in 1925 and almost wiped out the prickly pear. This case is often cited as an example of successful biological pest control.  

A monument to Cactoblastis cactorum was erected in Dalby, Queensland, commemorating the eradication of the prickly pear in the region. The Cactoblastis Memorial Hall in Boonarga, Queensland, also commemorates the eradication.

Species
These Opuntia species are recorded as naturalised in Australia:
Opuntia aurantiaca
Opuntia dejecta
Opuntia dillenii 
Opuntia elata
Opuntia elatior
Opuntia engelmannii
Opuntia ficus-indica
Opuntia humifusa 
Opuntia leucotricha
Opuntia microdasys
Opuntia monacantha
Opuntia polyacantha
Opuntia puberula
Opuntia robusta
Opuntia schickendantzii
Opuntia sp. Schrank 
Opuntia streptacantha
Opuntia stricta 
Opuntia sulphurea
Opuntia tomentosa

See also
Invasive species in Australia
Conservation in Australia
Agriculture in Australia

References

External links
Prickly Pear photograph album 1926-1933 digitised and held by State Library of Queensland
Prickly pears in Australia at the Australian Weeds Committee
History of prickly pear in Australia - from a New South Wales' perspective

Invasive plant species in Australia
 Australia